The 1938–39 NCAA football bowl games were the final games of the 1938 college football season and featured five games, each of which had been held the previous season. All five bowls were played on January 2, 1939, as New Year's Day fell on a Sunday. Contemporary polls selected different national champions, as the AP Poll named TCU, the Dunkel System chose Tennessee, and the Dickinson System designated Notre Dame.

Poll rankings
The below table lists top teams (per the AP Poll taken after the completion of the regular season), their win–loss records (prior to bowl games), and the bowls they later played in.

 The Big Ten Conference did not allow its members to participate in bowl games until the 1947 Rose Bowl.

Bowl schedule
Rankings are from the final regular season AP Poll.

Game recaps 
NOTE: Rankings used are the final regular season AP Rankings whenever noted

Rose Bowl

Orange Bowl

Sugar Bowl

Sun Bowl

Cotton Bowl Classic

References